Archdiocese of Mérida may refer to:

 Roman Catholic Archdiocese of Mérida-Badajoz in Spain
 Roman Catholic Archdiocese of Mérida in Venezuela